Miyauchi-Kushido Station is a railway station on the Sanyō Main Line in Hatsukaichi, Hiroshima, operated by West Japan Railway Company (JR West).

Platforms

Connecting lines

JR
█ Sanyō Main Line
Rapid Service
Itsukaichi Station — Miyauchi-Kushido Station — Miyajimaguchi Station
Local
Hatsukaichi Station — Miyauchi-Kushido Station — Ajina Station

Hiroden
█ Miyajima Line
Line #2
Hatsukaichi-shiyakusyo-mae (Hera) — Miyauchi — JA Hiroshimabyoin-mae
Hiroden Miyauchi Station is located to the south from JR Miyauchi-Kushido Station, 3 minutes walk from the station.

History
Opened on 3 April 1988.
The rapid service City Liner is going to stop from the day 15 March 2008

See also

 List of railway stations in Japan

References

External links
  

Sanyō Main Line
Hiroshima City Network
Railway stations in Japan opened in 1988